Tertry may refer to 
The Battle of Tertry or
Tertry, Somme, a commune in the Somme département in the Picardie region of France.